Jeanne Marie Henriette Filleul-Brohy née Haëntjens, (1 January 1867 - 20 April 1937) was a French croquet player. She competed at the 1900 Summer Olympics in two events; finishing 5th in the two ball singles and not finishing in the one ball singles.

References

External links

1867 births
1937 deaths
Olympic croquet players of France
French croquet players
Croquet players at the 1900 Summer Olympics
Sportspeople from Paris